Phalacraea is a genus of South American plants in the tribe Eupatorieae within the family Asteraceae.

 Species
 Phalacraea callitricha (B.L.Rob.) R.M.King & H.Rob. - Colombia, Ecuador
 Phalacraea ecuadorensis R.M.King & H.Rob.  - Ecuador
 Phalacraea latifolia  DC. - Peru
 Phalacraea longipetiolata (B.L.Rob.) R.M.King & H.Rob. - Colombia, Ecuador (=Steleocodon gracilis Gilli)

 formerly included
see Ageratum Alomia 
 Phalacraea coelestina Regel - Ageratum microcarpum (Benth. ex Oersted) Hemsley
 Phalacraea lindenii Sch.Bip. ex Benth. & Hook.f. - Alomia ageratoides Kunth
 Phalacraea wendlandii Sch.Bip. ex Klatt - Ageratum rugosum Coulter ex J. D. Smith

References 

 
Asteraceae genera
Taxonomy articles created by Polbot